Stories for the Soul is a Philippine television drama anthology show broadcast by GMA Network. Hosted by Manny Pacquiao, it premiered on October 29, 2017 on the network's Sunday Grande sa Gabi line up. The show concluded on June 30, 2019 with a total of 17 episodes.

Premise
The show features stories inspired by characters and stories from the Bible.

Episodes

Ratings
According to AGB Nielsen Philippines' Nationwide Urban Television Audience Measurement People in television homes, the pilot episode of Stories for the Soul earned a 2.4% rating.

Accolades

References

External links
 

2017 Philippine television series debuts
2019 Philippine television series endings
Filipino-language television shows
GMA Network original programming
Philippine anthology television series
Television shows set in the Philippines